Unbearable Lightness may refer to:

 The Unbearable Lightness of Being, a 1984 novel written by Czech author Milan Kundera
 The Unbearable Lightness of Being (film), a 1988 film based on the Kundera novel
 Unbearable Lightness, the autobiography of Australian actor Portia de Rossi